The international friendly between the Albania and Kosovo national football teams on 14 February 1993 was the first match played by Kosovo after the partition of Football Federation of Kosovo from Football Association of Yugoslavia. It took place at the Selman Stërmasi Stadium in Tirana, Albania with 14,000 fans in attendance.

Background
This match for Albania was the first match in 1993 after they were mathematically eliminated from 1994 FIFA World Cup qualification, but it was also a pre-preparation before the 1994 FIFA World Cup qualification match against Northern Ireland, where were tested players who were expected to play or make their debut in the match against Northern Ireland as Artan Bano, Ilir Shulku, Xhevahir Kapllani and several other players, while for Kosovo, this match was the first match in 1993 after 18 years since the last match that Kosovo had played against Macedonia in 1975 Brotherhood and Unity Tournament Final, which Kosovo won as group leader.

Match

Organization
This match was scheduled to take place on 26 or 27 December 1992, but due to the non-participation of the general director of the Albanian Football Association, Eduard Dervishi, who was on an official trip, the date of the match was not decided. Meanwhile, on 19 January 1993, a delegation of the Football Federation of Kosovo composed of the head coach Ajet Shosholli, Enver Nuredini and Sejdi Merkoja met with the leaders of the Albanian Football Federation in a meeting that lasted until 20 January, when in same day a cooperation protocol was signed, where it was agreed that on 14 February there will be a friendly match between Albania and Kosovo which would take place at the Selman Stërmasi Stadium in the Albania's capital, Tirana.

Problems with organizing of Kosovo national team's trip
The organized departure of the expedition by Kosovo was unachievable, because the bus would be stopped at the border by Serbian Police and would turn back and the match would fail. It was decided that each member of the expedition, individually, would travel to Skopje from where the collective departure to Albania would take place. Thus, the bus that was going to transport Kosovo crossed the Macedonian border and arrived in Skopje empty, but even though all this was done in secret, two SDB agents were at the Kosovo national team's meeting place which was in the Grand Hotel in Skopje, but fortunately pass without incident.

Squads composition
All caps and goals as of 14 February 1993 after the match.

Albania

Kosovo

Summary

References

External links
Match report at RSSSF

International association football matches
Kosovo
Albania
Albania v Kosovo football match
1992–93 in Albanian football